Khaled al-Mashhadani (full name Khaled Abdul-Fattah Dawoud Mahmoud al-Mashhadani, also known as Abu Shahed) was a senior operative of al-Qaeda in Iraq. He served as a liaison between al-Qaeda leadership in hiding in Pakistan and Abu Ayyub al-Masri until his capture on July 4, 2007, in Mosul.

References

External links
Khaled al-Mashhadani GlobalSecurity.Org

Living people
Members of al-Qaeda in Iraq
Year of birth missing (living people)
Place of birth missing (living people)